Maj. Gen. Ronaldo Cecilio Leiva Rodríguez is a Guatemalan military officer, who served as the Minister of Defence from 29 December 2006 to 14 January 2008.

References

Living people
Defense Ministers of Guatemala
Year of birth missing (living people)